Adrian Bancker (1703 – August 21, 1772), also known as Adriaan or Adrianus Bancker, was a prominent silversmith in New York City.

Bancker was the son of Evert Bancker, third mayor of Albany, New York, and baptized on October 10, 1703 in Albany. He was apprenticed to Henricus Boelen circa 1718 and made a freeman in 1731. In January of either  1728 or 1729 he married Gertrude Elizabeth Van Taerling, the daughter of Jan van Taerling, a former governor of Curaçao. He was a New York City alderman during the 1730s and 40s, a deacon in the Dutch Church, Commissioner of Fortifications in New York in 1755 and 1756, and from 1733 to 1766 was collector of the South Ward. In 1766 he advertised as being on Bridge Street, near the Exchange. He died in Albany on August 21, 1772.

Bancker's work is collected in the Metropolitan Museum of Art, Winterthur, the Museum of the City of New York, the Clark Art Institute, and the Minneapolis Institute of Art.

Gallery

References

Further reading
 New York Genealogical and Bibliographical Record Devoted to the Interests of American Genealogy and Biography, New York Genealogical and Biographical Society, 1869, pages 68–69.
 American Silversmiths and Their Marks: The Definitive (1948) Edition, Stephen G. C. Ensko, Courier Corporation, 2012, page 111.

External links
 "c. 1735 Adrian Bancker coin silver spoon", American Silver before sterling Forum.
 An American silver teapot, Adrian Bancker, New York, circa 1730, Sothebys.
 Adrian Bancker by Stefan Bielinski
 Caster, c. 1735, by Adrian Bancker, Metropolitan Museum of Art
 Adrian Bancker, Clark Art Institute

American silversmiths
1703 births
1772 deaths